John Aloysius Mone (22 June 1929 – 14 October 2016) was the third Roman Catholic Bishop of Paisley.

Early life
John Mone was fourth of the six children of Arthur Mone and Elizabeth Dunn. Born in Glasgow, he was raised in the Crosshill district.

Priesthood
After studies with the Sulpicians at Issy-les-Moulineaux, France and at the rue du Regard and the Institut Catholique in Paris he was ordained to the priesthood on 12 June 1952. Thereafter he served as curate for twenty two years at St Ninian's in Knightswood and for five years at Our Lady and St George in Penilee. In 1979 he was made parish priest of St Joseph's Tollcross.

Episcopate
On 24 April 1984 he was created auxiliary bishop of Glasgow and titular Bishop of Abercornia by Pope John Paul II and was consecrated by Thomas Winning, Archbishop of Glasgow, at Holy Cross Church in Glasgow, the church where he had been baptised. He was translated to the see of Paisley on 8 March 1988 to succeed Stephen McGill and was installed as its bishop at St Mirin's Cathedral in Paisley on 14 May 1988. Mone served as ordinary of the diocese until his retirement on 7 October 2004.

During his episcopate and in retirement he frequently criticised the Dungavel Detention Centre, a holding unit for asylum seekers.

His motto was To Lead in Love.

Bishop Mone died at the Holy Rosary Home in Greenock on 14 October 2016.

References

External links
 Dungavel unit closure demanded. BBC News, 16 July 2003.
 Scottish Catholic Media Office
 

1929 births
2016 deaths
20th-century Roman Catholic bishops in Scotland
21st-century Roman Catholic bishops in Scotland
Clergy from Glasgow
People from Renfrewshire
Roman Catholic bishops of Paisley
Scottish Roman Catholic bishops